5-epiaristolochene 1,3-dihydroxylase (5-epi-aristolochene 1,3-dihydroxylase, EAH) is an enzyme with systematic name 5-epiaristolochene,NADPH:oxygen oxidoreductase (1- and 3-hydroxylating). This enzyme catalyses the following chemical reaction

 5-epiaristolochene + 2 NADPH + 2 H+ + 2 O2  capsidiol + 2 NADP+ + 2 H2O

5-epiaristolochene 1,3-dihydroxylase is a heme-thiolate protein (P-450).

References

External links 
 

EC 1.14.13